The Alabama Theatre is a public theatre located in the Barefoot Landing shopping complex in North Myrtle Beach, South Carolina, United States. Opened in 1993, the theatre hosts shows geared towards families vacationing in the Myrtle Beach area.  The theatre hosts traditional country music singers. The theatre has gained media attention from the CBS Morning Show, CMT, TNN and many national/regional publications.

The theatre is named after the country music band Alabama.

References

External links

Theatres in South Carolina
Theatres completed in 1993
Tourist attractions in Myrtle Beach, South Carolina
Buildings and structures in Myrtle Beach, South Carolina
1993 establishments in South Carolina